Saint-Nolff is a commune in the Morbihan department of Brittany in north-western France. Inhabitants of Saint-Nolff are called in French Nolfféens.

Heraldry
 Vairé d'or et de sable; au franc-canton de gueules à l'aigle d'argent, becqué, membré et lampassé d'or. 
("Colour of gold and yellow; "canton-fair" in red and eagle in white, with gold beak, legs carved and langued in gold")

Twin towns
Saint-Nolff is twinned with:

  Pedrajas de San Esteban, Spain, since 1991

Buildings

Saint-Mayeul's church (French: église Saint-Mayeul) was built in the 16th century.

See also
Communes of the Morbihan department

References

External links

 Mayors of Morbihan Association 

Saintnolff